Utz Chwalla (born 22 September 1942) is an Austrian bobsledder. He competed in the four man event at the 1972 Winter Olympics.

References

1942 births
Living people
Austrian male bobsledders
Olympic bobsledders of Austria
Bobsledders at the 1972 Winter Olympics
People from Frýdek-Místek